Chinese American Film Festival (CAFF) is an American film festival held every November since 2006 in California (with events in Los Angeles and San Francisco, previously also in San Diego).

History 
In 2005, the Chinese American Film Festival was founded by EDI Media Inc. It is the only film festival recognized by both Motion Picture Association of America and China's State Administration of Press, Publication, Radio, Film and Television.

2018
In 2018, the 14th annual Chinese American Film Festival was held in Los Angeles, California. On October 28 2018, a Welcome Banquet was held at the San Gabriel Hilton Hotel in San Gabriel, California. 

On October 30, 2018, the Chinese American Film Festival opening ceremony was held at the Ricardo Montalan Theater in Hollywood, California. Winners include Chow Yun-fat, Li Bingbing, Kelsey Scott, Xu Lu, Byron Mann, and many others.

References

External links
Official website
Chinese American Film Festival on Film Freeway
Chinese American Film Festival on iMDB
14th Annual CAFF from 360mediahub.com with complete list of winners

Film festivals in California
2005 establishments in California
Asian-American culture in Los Angeles
Asian-American film festivals
Film festivals established in 2005